Oskar Fredriksen  (9 February 1909 – 19 June 1991) was a Norwegian cross-country skier who competed in the 1930s. He won a gold medal in the 4 × 10 km relay at the 1937 FIS Nordic World Ski Championships.

Cross-country skiing results

World Championships
 1 medal – (1 gold)

References
World Championship results 

Norwegian male cross-country skiers
1909 births
1991 deaths
FIS Nordic World Ski Championships medalists in cross-country skiing